Ince is a civil parish in Cheshire West and Chester, England. It contains 25 buildings that are recorded in the National Heritage List for England as designated listed buildings. One is these is of these listed at Grade I, the highest grade, one at Grade II*, the middle grade, and the rest are at the lowest grade, Grade II.

Apart from the village of Ince, the parish is entirely rural, and the listed buildings include farms and farm buildings. During the medieval era, it was the site of Ince Manor, a monastic grange of St Werburgh's, Abbey, Chester, (later Chester Cathedral). Following the dissolution of the monasteries, the surviving buildings were used for other purposes, including domestic use and for farming. These buildings are listed. In the early 19th century it was hoped that the village would be a centre for passengers using the Ince Ferry, and Edmund Yates built a number of properties, including a hotel. However the ferry closed and the buildings, some of which are listed, were converted for domestic use. The other buildings in the list include the village church and associated structures, the village stocks, a commemorative lamp post, and a telephone kiosk.

Key

Buildings

See also
 Listed buildings in Ellesmere Port
 Listed buildings in Elton
 Listed buildings in Frodsham
 Listed buildings in Helsby

References
Citations

Sources

Listed buildings in Cheshire West and Chester
Lists of listed buildings in Cheshire